Miodrag Rajković (born 8 March 1971) is a Serbian professional basketball coach.

Head coaching record

|-
| style="text-align:left;"|Toyama Grouses
| style="text-align:left;"|2017-18
| 60||24||36|||| style="text-align:center;"|5th in Central|||-||-||-||
| style="text-align:center;"|-
|-
| style="text-align:left;"|Nishinomiya Storks
| style="text-align:left;"|2018-19
| 60||34||26|||| style="text-align:center;"| 3rd in B2 Central|||-||-||-||
| style="text-align:center;"|-
|-

External links
Biography at BeoBasket.net
Coach Profile at Eurobasket.com

References

1971 births
Living people
KK Crvena zvezda assistant coaches
KK Mega Basket coaches
Nishinomiya Storks coaches
Serbian men's basketball coaches
Serbian expatriate basketball people in Montenegro
Serbian expatriate basketball people in Poland
Serbian expatriate basketball people in Japan
BKK Radnički coaches
Tokyo Hachioji Bee Trains coaches
Toyama Grouses coaches
University of Belgrade Faculty of Sport and Physical Education alumni